Konta is a Municipal Council and tehsil headquarters in Sukma district, Chhattisgarh, India.
Konta is a model town situated near bank of sabri River and Konta Legislative Assembly constituency is one of the 90 Legislative Assembly

| Konta Municipal Council       = Zakir Hussain Chhattisgarh (politician)Vice president

Geography

Location
Konta is connected to Jagdalpur and Vijayawada by the National Highway 221. It is near the state border with Andhra Pradesh. The nearest airport is Jagdalpur Airport.

References

External links
 

Cities and towns in Sukma district
Tehsils of Chhattisgarh